Perote is a city and municipality in the Mexican state of Veracruz. It serves as the seat of government for the surrounding municipality of the same name, which borders on
Las Vigas de Ramírez, Acajete, Xico and Tlalnelhuayocan, and the state of Puebla. It is on Federal Highway 140.

Its climate is cold and dry with an annual average temperature of 12 degrees Celsius.

Perote's fortress of San Carlos once served as a prison. Guadalupe Victoria died there.

Also in Perote is the Cofre de Perote shield-shaped volcano (the Nahuatl name of which was "Naucampatepetl," which means "four times lord").

This town is the home of a sizable Spanish community which immigrated here in the 1930s.  Because of this, it is known for Spanish-style cured meats and sausage such as jamón serrano (serrano ham), botifarra (Catalán sausage), and Spanish chorizo sausage.

References

External links
 Pictures of Perote - one has in the background the Cofre de Perote, another is a picture of a local bus.

Populated places in Veracruz
Oriental Basin